Animal is a 2014 American horror thriller film directed by Brett Simmons and starring Elizabeth Gillies, Keke Palmer, Jeremy Sumpter, Eve, and Joey Lauren Adams. The film follows a group of friends that find themselves terrorized by a bloodthirsty beast.
The film was released in a limited release and through video on demand on June 17, 2014.

Plot
The film opens with two married couples - Carl and Vicky, and Douglas and Barbara - being chased through the woods by a mysterious beast. Barbara is killed.

Sometime later, five college students - Alissa, her boyfriend Matt, her half-brother Jeff, Jeff's girlfriend Mandy, and their friend Sean - arrive in the forest to hike. Jeff gets the others to try to find a waterfall he, Alissa, and their father used to go to as kids, but they end up taking so long that it is dark by the time they start walking back to the car. Along the way, they discover the remains of Barbara's body and encounter the same monster that killed her. It chases them through the forest. They see a cabin in the distance. When they try to get to the cabin, it kills Jeff.

When they arrive at the cabin, the group desperately bangs on the doors and screams for whoever is inside to help them. As the monster approaches, the people in the cabin finally open the door for them. Mandy gets attacked as she enters the cabin, but the group manages to pull her in and board up the door. In the cabin, they find Carl, Vicky, and Douglas, who have sealed the windows and walls with boards to protect themselves against the creature. While Carl and Vicky are hopeful that they will be rescued soon, Douglas is bitterly cynical. The creature almost breaks into the house, but they hold it off. Matt volunteers to take a walkie-talkie and make a run for the car while Carl and Sean keep watch for the creature. However, his screams are heard on the walkie-talkie. Douglas attempts to board up the entrance, leaving Sean and Carl to die outside, but the girls help them get in through the back. The group ties Douglas to the stairs, no longer trusting him.

Mandy reveals to Alissa that she is pregnant while Sean confesses to Mandy that he and Jeff were having an affair. The group discovers Matt, barely alive, in the cellar, along with the animal. They get Matt upstairs but Carl is killed. Douglas proposes that the group let the animal eat Matt as a bait so they can escape. The group refuses and decides to trap the animal inside the house and burn it down. However, when they untie Douglas to help, he beats Matt to death, calling the others weak. The animal breaks in and kills Douglas. As it eats his body, the others spread kerosene throughout the house. Alissa lures the animal into the trap. She sets the fire and burns the monster to death.

However, a second animal suddenly appears in the cellar and kills Sean and Vicky. Mandy and Alissa flee into the woods. Alissa is killed but Mandy is able to reach the car. The second animal attacks her and Mandy manages to kill it by running its head over with the car. She escapes and drives away, sobbing.

The final scene shows a third animal sniffing at the second animal's corpse, where it grunts aggressively, suggesting a call to the pack.

Cast
Elizabeth Gillies as Mandy 
Keke Palmer as Alissa
Jeremy Sumpter as Matt
Parker Young as Jeff
Paul Iacono as Sean
Amaury Nolasco as Douglas
Thorsten Kaye as Carl
Joey Lauren Adams as Vicky
Eve as Barbara

Production
The film was shot in Manchester, Connecticut. Actress Keke Palmer said she enjoyed making the movie. However, she said filming the outdoor locations in the woods "was not fun. The outdoors s---? Oh, no, no, no, no. The outdoors in the weeds, in the bushes, in the middle of Connecticut? Oh, hell no. I would have loved another destination, but hey."

Reception
The film holds a 43% rating on Rotten Tomatoes, based on 7 reviews.

Shock Till You Drop and Bloody Disgusting both panned the film, and Shock Till You Drop stated that the movie was "a waste of a good, old-fashioned creature." We Got This Covered gave Animal a slightly more positive rating and commented that "Animal has enough carnage to appease more forgiving horror fans, but despite a quick pace and brutal kills, it's repetition that truly kills this beast."

References

External links
 
 
 

2014 films
2014 horror films
American horror thriller films
2014 horror thriller films
2010s monster movies
American monster movies
Films shot in Connecticut
Flower Films films
Films scored by Tomandandy
2010s English-language films
2010s American films